Anisacanthus quadrifidus is a species of flowering plant native to west and south-central Texas in the United States and adjacent northern Mexico down through the state of Oaxaca.  It is an increasingly common ornamental shrub in Texas and is cultivated in other parts of the Southwestern United States.

Name 
It is known by a variety of names including flame acanthus, Wright's desert honeysuckle,  hummingbird bush, Wright acanthus, Wright anisacanth, Texas firecracker, Mexican flame and Wright's Mexican flame. "Wright" refers to American botanist Charles Wright who collected samples of the plant in the mid-19th century. Some sources also refer to it as muicle although this name is usually applied to the related Justicia spicigera when used as a traditional medicine in Central America.

Habitat 
It is found on rocky and dry slopes, grasslands, xerophytic scrub and Mexican pinyon forests. It is also frequently on crop banks or in sloped arid areas at heights from 1500 to 2450 meters (4920 to 8040 ft) above sea level. It adapts well to other soils when under cultivation, however, it displays poor tolerance to frost.

References

Acanthaceae
Flora of Mexico
Flora of the United States